Apr. 9 - Eastern Orthodox liturgical calendar - Apr. 11

All fixed commemorations below are observed on April 23 by Eastern Orthodox Churches on the Old Calendar.

For April 10th, Orthodox Churches on the Old Calendar commemorate the Saints listed on March 28.

Saints

 Prophetess Huldah (Olda) (IV Kings 22:14)
 Martyrs Terence, Africanus, Maximus, Pompeius, and 36 others, including Zeno, Alexander, and Theodore, at Carthage (250) (see also: October 28, March 13, April 5)
 Saint Miltiades, Pope of Rome (314) 
 Hieromartyrs James the Presbyter, and the Deacons Azadanes and Abdicius, of Persia (c. 380)

Pre-Schism Western saints

 Martyrs of Rome (c. 115) 
 Saint Palladius, Abbot of St Germanus in Auxerre, he became bishop there and founded several monasteries (661)
 Martyrs Beocca, Ethor and others, at Chertsey Abbey, by the Danes (869) 
 Saint Bede the Younger, a court official who became a monk at the monastery of Gavello near Rovigo (883)
 Saint Macarius of Antioch (1012)

Post-Schism Orthodox saints

 The Holy Martyrs of Kvabtakhevi Monastery, Georgia, who suffered during the invasion of Tamerlane (1386)
 Nun-martyr Anastasia, Abbess, and 34 nuns with her, of Uglich (1609)
 Venerable martyrs of the Daou Penteli Monastery, in Penteli, by Algerian pirate raiders, (end-17th century) 
 New Martyr George of Cyprus, at Acre, Palestine (1753)
 New Martyr Demos (Demetrios) of Smyrna (1763) 
 New Hieromartyr Gregory V, Ecumenical Patriarch of Constantinople (1821)
 Seven Hieromartyr Bishops, arrested together with Ecumenical Patriarch Gregory V, subsequently martyred by the Ottoman Turks at the start of the Greek War of Independence (1821): 
 Eugenios of Anchialos.
 Iosif of Thessaloniki. (see also: June 3)
 Gregorios of Derkoi. (see also: June 3)
 Dionysios of Ephesus.
 Dorotheos of Andrianople. (see also: June 3)
 Athanasios of Nicomedia.
 Ioannichios of Tarnovo.
 New Monk-martyr Chrysanthus of Xenophontos monastery, Mt. Athos, on Pascha (1821)

New martyrs and confessors

 New Hieromartyr Flegont Pongilsky, Archpriest, of Yaroslavl  (1938)
 Martyr Demetrius Vdovin (1942)

Other commemorations

 Consecration of Ioasaph (Bolotov) as Bishop of Kodiak, Alaska (1799)

Icon gallery

Notes

References

Sources
 April 10 / April 23. Orthodox Calendar (pravoslavie.ru).
 April 23 / April 10. Holy Trinity Russian Orthodox Church (A parish of the Patriarchate of Moscow).
 April 10. OCA - The Lives of the Saints.
 The Autonomous Orthodox Metropolia of Western Europe and the Americas. St. Hilarion Calendar of Saints for the year of our Lord 2004. St. Hilarion Press (Austin, TX). pp. 27–28.
 April 10. Latin Saints of the Orthodox Patriarchate of Rome.
 The Roman Martyrology. Transl. by the Archbishop of Baltimore. Last Edition, According to the Copy Printed at Rome in 1914. Revised Edition, with the Imprimatur of His Eminence Cardinal Gibbons. Baltimore: John Murphy Company, 1916. p. 101.
 Rev. Richard Stanton. A Menology of England and Wales, or, Brief Memorials of the Ancient British and English Saints Arranged According to the Calendar, Together with the Martyrs of the 16th and 17th Centuries. London: Burns & Oates, 1892. p. 151.
Greek Sources
 Great Synaxaristes:  10 Απριλιου. Μεγασ Συναξαριστησ.
  Συναξαριστής. 10 Απριλίου. ecclesia.gr. (H Εκκλησια Τησ Ελλαδοσ). 
Russian Sources
  23 апреля (10 апреля). Православная Энциклопедия под редакцией Патриарха Московского и всея Руси Кирилла (электронная версия). (Orthodox Encyclopedia - Pravenc.ru).
  10 апреля (ст.ст.) 23 апреля 2013 (нов. ст.). Русская Православная Церковь Отдел внешних церковных связей.

April in the Eastern Orthodox calendar